Aben Kandel (15 August 1897 – 28 January 1993) was an American screenwriter, novelist, and (earlier in life) boxer. He was screenwriter on such classic B movies as I Was A Teenage Werewolf, Joan Crawford's final movie Trog, and one of Leonard Nimoy's first starring vehicles, Kid Monk Baroni.  He is the father of poetess Lenore Kandel and screenwriter Stephen Kandel.

Biography
Born in Berlad, Romania, Kandel came to the United States as a child and was educated at New York University and its law school. He served in the U.S. Army during World War I and later enlisted in the U.S. Coast & Geodetic Survey.

He began writing novels in 1927 and wrote two hit plays Hot Money (1931) that was filmed as High Pressure (1932) and Hot Money (1936),
and translated a German play Die Wunderbar by Geza Herczeg and Karl Farkas together with Irving Caesar where the pair added their own songs calling at The Wonder Bar that was acquired by Al Jolson and filmed in 1934.  One of Kandel's unpublished short stories So, You Won't Sing, Eh? was filmed as Sing and Like It (1934).  Kandel began writing Hollywood stories and screenplays with Manhattan Moon (1935).  His novel City for Conquest (1936), based on some of his experiences as a boxer was made into a James Cagney feature in 1940.

Kandel began writing for American television in 1950 whilst continuing to write screenplays and novels.

In 1957 he began writing several lurid screenplays for producer Herman Cohen, for whom he had written Kid Monk Baroni.  Cohen and Kandel collaborated on such classic films such as I Was a Teenage Werewolf, I Was a Teenage Frankenstein, Blood of Dracula (all 1957), How to Make a Monster (1958), Horrors of the Black Museum and The Headless Ghost (both 1959), Konga (1961), Black Zoo, (1963), Berserk! (1967, that he also co-produced), Trog (1970), and Craze (1974). As Kandel was involved in writing prestigious film scripts for major film studies such as MGM and Warner Bros. he used pseudonyms such as Ralph Thornton and Kenneth Langtry.<ref>p. 56 Weaver, Tom Herman Cohen Interview]] in Double Feature Creature Attack: A Monster Merger of Two More Volumes of Classic Interviews McFarland, 19 Feb 2003</ref>

Personal life and death
Kandel had two children, a son, Stephen and daughter, Lenore.  He died of heart failure at the Motion Picture and Television Hospital in 1993, at age 95.

Novels
 Vaudeville (1927)
 Black Son (1929)
 Ex-Baby (1930)
 Rabbi Burns (1931)
 City of Conquest'' (1936)

Filmography

Films

Television

External links
N.Y. Times obituary: "Aben Kandel, Screenwriter, 96"

Notes

1897 births
1993 deaths
Boxing writers
American male novelists
American male screenwriters
20th-century American novelists
20th-century American male writers
20th-century American screenwriters